Louis-Charles Boucher de Niverville,  (August 12, 1825 – August 1, 1869) was a Quebec lawyer and political figure. He represented Trois-Rivières in the House of Commons of Canada.

Early background

He was born in Trois-Rivières, Lower Canada on August 12, 1825. He studied at the Séminaire de Nicolet, went on to study law and was called to the bar in 1849.

Before 1867

Boucher de Niverville was the Mayor of Trois-Rivières from 1863 to 1865.

He was elected as a member of the Parti bleu to the Legislative Assembly of the Province of Canada for Trois-Rivières in an 1865 by-election.  He succeeded Joseph-Édouard Turcotte who had recently died.  Boucher de Niverville spoke in the Assembly in favour of the Quebec Resolutions in 1865.

After 1867

After the British North America Act of 1867 was enacted, Boucher de Niverville joined the Conservative Party.  The district of Trois-Rivières elected him to both the House of Commons and the Legislative Assembly of Quebec.  He was also appointed to the Queen's Counsel.

After retirement from politics

In 1868, he retired from politics and accepted the post of sheriff for the district of Trois-Rivières.

He died in Trois-Rivières on August 1, 1869 after suffering from lung disease.

External links
 
Biography at the Dictionary of Canadian Biography Online
 

1825 births
1869 deaths
Members of the Legislative Assembly of the Province of Canada from Canada East
Conservative Party of Quebec MNAs
Conservative Party of Canada (1867–1942) MPs
Members of the House of Commons of Canada from Quebec
Mayors of Trois-Rivières
Canadian King's Counsel